Thinset (also called thinset mortar, thinset cement, dryset mortar, or drybond mortar) is an adhesive mortar made of cement, fine sand and a water-retaining agent such as an alkyl derivative of cellulose. It is usually used to attach tile or stone to surfaces such as cement or concrete. It is particularly popular among mosaicists for outdoor applications 

Thinset is generally available in two types: unmodified and modified (polymer-modified). Modified thinset has been developed to enhance the strength of the bond in addition to improving working conditions of the material (i.e. working time, working temperature range, etc.). It is usually more expensive than standard, unmodified thinset.

References

External links
 How to Spread Thinset for Ceramic Tile. Accessed 14 June 2014. 
  C-Cure ThinSet 911 Dry-Set Portland Cement Mortar. Accessed 14 June 2014.

Soil-based building materials
Cement
Masonry